Rautiainen is a Finnish surname. Notable people with the surname include:

 Pasi Rautiainen (born 1961), Finnish football manager and former player
 Timo Rautiainen (musician) (born 1963), Finnish heavy metal singer, guitarist and songwriter
 Timo Rautiainen (co-driver) (born 1964), Finnish rally co-driver
 Teemu Rautiainen (born 1992), Finnish professional ice hockey player

Finnish-language surnames